Eva Lotte Louise Vlaardingerbroek (born 3 September 1996) is a Dutch opinion writer and political activist. She is noted for her criticism of the Mark Rutte government and globalism, and has been particularly vocal about the issues surrounding farmers in the Dutch farmer's protests. RTL Nieuws describes her as having "gained notoriety on television and social media for her right-wing views", and she has made numerous appearances with Tucker Carlson on Tucker Carlson Tonight programme of the American Fox News and The Mark Steyn Show on the British GBNews.

Education and early work
Vlaardingerbroek studied law at Utrecht University, where she participated in the honors program (Utrecht Law College). After studying for some time in Munich at the Ludwig Maximilian University of Munich and completing her bachelor's degree, she began the master's degree in Encyclopedia and Philosophy of Law at Leiden University. She wrote her master's thesis on The Contractualization of Sex and completed her master's with honors.

After her studies, in 2016 she joined the Forum for Democracy (FVD) group in the European Parliament, in Brussels. In 2019 she gave a speech against modern feminism at the FVD's party congress. On October 31, 2020, party leader Thierry Baudet announced that Vlaardingerbroek would be in fifth place on the FVD candidate list for the House of Representatives. After a crisis broke out between Baudet and the FVD board, Vlaardingerbroek announced on the television program Goedemorgen Nederland on November 26, 2020, that she had sided with the board in that conflict. Later on this day, she announced that she was withdrawing as a candidate MP and ending her membership in the party.

Opinion work and activism
Vlaardingerbroek left Brussels behind to work in Leiden as a lecturer-researcher, in which year she published several opinion pieces in Elseviers Weekblad. In October 2020, she put her position at the university and her dissertation on hold to focus fully on a political career, which did not take off.

In December 2019, Het Parool stated that Vlaardingerbroek "shocked all of feminist Holland with a speech against modern feminism", in which she called it "a form of hardcore cognitive dissonance".  She stated that "neo-feminists have no reflection on what is retrograde or problematic about multiculturalism, especially on the subject that interests them: sexism. So, this feminism is indeed one of the biggest shams of our time". She received scathing criticism by a number of Dutch commentators for her remarks, with Bert Djkstra of De Telegraaf saying that the "Servant virgin of the radical right" had "shown her true face".

In 2021, she worked for some time in Sweden as presenter of her own pan-European talk show "Let's Talk About It" on the YouTube channel of Swedish media outlet Riks, which is affiliated with the far-right party Sverigedemokraterna. On January 1, 2022, she began working as a legal advisor at a law firm, where she focused on human rights and civil litigation. After more than four months, this employment was terminated.

In April 2022, Vlaardingerbroek spoke at the Brussels National Conservatism Conference in Brussels in which she called on people to "reject Globalism and embrace God". In early July 2022, Vlaardingerbroek spoke out about the Dutch nitrogen crisis on the American television channel Fox News in conversation with Tucker Carlson. She claims that the crisis is being used to steal land from farmers in order to build homes on it for immigrants as part of the "Great Reset". Vlaardingerbroek has also opined in her appearances with Carlson that the surge in violent crime in Sweden could be linked to "extreme" immigration policies. Vlaardingerbroek regularly appears as a commentator on The Mark Steyn Show on the British television channel GBNews and on the right-wing populist YouTube channel Achtung, Reichelt! by the former editor-in-chief of the German newspaper BILD, Julian Reichelt. 

In March 2023, Vlaardingerbroek participated in the farmer's protests against the government in The Hague. At the protests, Vlaardingerbroek stated that "Our farmers are fighting against the worst kind of injustice".

Personal life
Vlaardingerbroek is the daughter of musicologist and concert director Kees Vlaardingerbroek [NL], and grew up in Hilversum. She had a relationship until late 2020 with Julien Rochedy, a French writer who in his youth was president of the youth wing of Front National.

During the conflict within the FVD in November 2020, during which Vlaardingerbroek publicly turned against Thierry Baudet, Baudet brought out that he had had a love affair with her in 2017, to which Vlaardingerbroek stated that it had been nothing more than a brief fling.

References

1996 births
Living people
Dutch political journalists
Dutch political activists
People from Hilversum
Utrecht University alumni